Taha El Sherif Ben Amer(June 1936 - March 6, 1978) was a Libyan engineer and politician.

He was born in the city of Benghazi, Libya in June 1936. He spent his childhood in Benghazi where he finished his primary school and high school. He was awarded a scholarship in order to pursue his education in Cairo, Egypt. In 1959 he obtained a bachelor's degree with honours in Civil Engineering from Ain Shams University.

Soon after graduation, he went back to Benghazi to work as a Junior Engineer and establish an engineering office which involved in many engineering projects across the eastern region of Libya. After the revolution in Libya in 1969, Taha El Sherif was appointed as the Deputy Minister of Transportation until 1971. Then, he became the Minister of Transportation to 1975. Soon after this date, he was selected as the Secretary of State.

On March 6, 1978 Taha El Sherif Ben Amer died in a helicopter crash of which he was going to visit a project near the city of Tripoli with the East German Politburo member Werner Lamberz who was the party's second most important ideological spokesman.

References

External links 
 Libyan People's Committee article on Arabic Wikipedia
 An article about scouting in Libya (in Arabic)
 Article about East Germany that mentions the helicopter crash

1936 births
1978 deaths
Ain Shams University alumni
People from Benghazi
Members of the General People's Committee of Libya
Victims of aviation accidents or incidents in Libya
Victims of helicopter accidents or incidents
Transport ministers of Libya
Libyan engineers
20th-century engineers